Podocarpus steyermarkii is a species of conifer in the family Podocarpaceae. It is found only in Venezuela.

References

steyermarkii
Least concern plants
Taxonomy articles created by Polbot